Kitchen Nightmares, known in the U.K. as Ramsay's Kitchen Nightmares USA, is an American reality television series originally broadcast on the Fox network, in which chef Gordon Ramsay is invited by the owners to spend a week with a failing restaurant in an attempt to revive the business. Produced by ITV Studios America, it is based on the British show Ramsay's Kitchen Nightmares.

The show premiered September 19, 2007, on Fox. On June 23, 2014, Ramsay announced that he was ending the series; the final episode aired on September 12 that year. In June 2018, Gordon Ramsay's 24 Hours to Hell and Back, a new series with a premise much like Kitchen Nightmares but a shorter timeline, premiered on Fox. The show still hosts an active YouTube channel with over 6.4 million subscribers. The channel presents highlights from the show, and has also shown selected full episodes of the show.

Production
The show was produced by ITV Studios America and Optomen, in association with A. Smith & Co. Productions, with Arthur Smith, Kent Weed, and Patricia Llewellyn serving as executive producers.

In the UK, the series is broadcast under the name Kitchen Nightmares USA and Ramsay's Kitchen Nightmares USA on Channel 4, which also produced the original UK version. It's broadcast under this name to avoid confusion with the original UK version. UK airings of the US show feature an alternate soundtrack and mix, with less prominent musical stings, a lower level of vocal compression, and a different narrator to the US broadcast. It also airs uncensored, when shown after the watershed. Reruns, along with the British series, are frequently shown on BBC America.

Episodes

Series overview

Season 1 (2007)

Season 2 (2008–09)

Season 3 (2010) 
The third season was originally scheduled to premiere on Wednesday, January 27, 2010, but it was postponed to Friday, January 29, 2010, due to the State of the Union address.

Season 4 (2011) 
In May 2010, the Fox network announced the return of Kitchen Nightmares for a fourth season, which aired from January 21, 2011, to May 20, 2011.

Season 5 (2011–12) 
In March 2011, the producers of the show announced a casting call for a fifth season. The fifth season premiered on Friday, September 23, 2011, and ended on March 30, 2012.

Season 6 (2012–13) 
In February 2012, Fox announced it had renewed Kitchen Nightmares for a sixth season, which premiered on Friday, October 26, 2012.

Season 7 (2014) 
Season 7 was originally set to premiere on February 28, 2014, but was delayed until April 11, 2014.

Lawsuits 
In September 2007, a case was filed by Martin Hyde, a former manager of Dillon's, against Ramsay for ten separate offenses, including allegedly staging disasters and hiring actors to trick the viewing audience. The case was dismissed because the contract signed by Hyde stipulated arbitration in the event of a legal dispute. The case went into arbitration in 2008.

In 2018, Oceana Grill sued Ramsay and the show's production company alleging fabrication. Specifically, they claimed that Ramsay staged a scene where he vomited during his kitchen inspection and planted a mouse in a rodent trap "to manufacture drama for their show." The restaurant also argued that a prior settlement from 2011 (before the episode aired) placed limits on the production company's ability to re-use clips from their episode. The 2018 suit was filed after the production company posted clips of the Oceana Grill episode on Facebook.

Reception 

Ginia Bellafante of the New York Times found Ramsay's teaching methods and high standards "undeniably hypnotic" and commented, "the thrill of watching Mr. Ramsay is in witnessing someone so at peace with his own arrogance."
Doug Elfman of the Chicago Sun-Times said the show is "a very entertaining public service" that "will make you laugh, make you sick, and make you think".
Randy Cordova of the Arizona Republic found Ramsay "just as blustery and foul-mouthed here as he is on Hell's Kitchen. But he is also oddly endearing, mainly because he genuinely seems invested in the fate of each restaurant".

Critics have commented that Fox's adaptation of Kitchen Nightmares strayed from the strengths of the original Channel 4 series. Maureen Ryan of the Chicago Tribune said, "Leave it to Fox to take something the Brits did pretty well and muck it up". She added, "Never mind the cooking; this edition of the show appears to be more interested in playing up the family dramas at the restaurants Ramsay visits".
Robert Lloyd of the Los Angeles Times commented, "Whereas the British Ramsay's Kitchen Nightmares is fundamentally a food show—it has interesting things to show you about how a restaurant runs and a kitchen works, the wonders of local markets and what you can make from them if you're Gordon Ramsay or willing to follow his instructions—the Fox edition emphasizes mishap, argument, and emotional breakdown almost to the exclusion of cuisine".

See also 
 Bar Rescue
 Hotel Hell
 Restaurant: Impossible
 Restaurant Makeover
 Restaurant Stakeout

Notes

References 

General references

External links 

 
 

2007 American television series debuts
2014 American television series endings
2000s American reality television series
2010s American reality television series
American television series based on British television series
English-language television shows
Food reality television series
Fox Broadcasting Company original programming
Television series by Optomen
Television series by All3Media
Television series by ITV Studios
2000s American workplace television series
2010s American workplace television series